The rape of Yasmin Akhter refers to the rape and murder of a 14-year-old girl by members of Bangladesh Police in 1995 which resulted in mass protests in Dinajpur.

History

Incident
Yasmin Akhter was a 14 year old domestic helper in Dhaka. She was returning to her hometown in Dashmile area in Dinajpur on 24 August 1995 when she got on the wrong bus and became lost. She was then offered a lift by three members of the Bangladesh Police Force in a police van. The officers were later identified as Moinul Hoque, Abdus Sattar, and Amrita Lal. However, instead of taking her home, the three officers then drove Akhter to a secluded spot, where she was gang-raped and strangled to death. Her body was then thrown off the side of a road and discovered the next day.

Reaction
On 25 August 1995, Manoranjan Shill Gopal, the local Member of Parliament had informed Matiur Rahman the editor of local newspaper, The Daily Uttarbangla, that police had raped and killed a girl. Rahman learned the identity of the victim on 26 August and wanted to publish a news article but he was warned by the police not to. At night the police cut the electric supply to the news office. Rahman borrowed the electricity of his neighbor and used that to publish the news. Following the publication of the news mass protest erupted. The local police station was attacked and looted. Curfew was declared in the area. Police fired on protesters killing 17 and injuring about 100 people.

Trial and legacy
Three police officers were accused in the case. Two of the police officers, Moinul Hoque and Abdus Sattar, were arrested in 1997. They were tried and found guilty of rape and murder and sentenced to death by hanging. Amrita Lal was arrested years after the verdict, but also received a death sentence. The trial process had faced resistance from the police who initially refused to register the case. The government was under pressure from women's rights activists and the civil society. 

Hoque and Sattar were both executed by hanging on September 1, 2004, in Rangpur Central Jail. Later that same month, after his clemency requests were denied, Lal was also executed by hanging at Rangpur, though he expressed remorse to the victim's family prior to his death.

24 August is marked as Resistance Day against Repression of Women in Bangladesh.

References

1995 murders in Bangladesh
August 1995 events in Asia
Bangladesh Police
Child sexual abuse in Bangladesh
History of Bangladesh (1971–present)
Incidents of violence against girls
Murder in Bangladesh
Rape in Bangladesh